John 'Jack' Dougherty (born 1931) is an Australian rugby league footballer who played in the 1950s.

Playing career
A schoolboy product from Marist Brothers Hamilton, he played for the South Sydney club in the NSWRFL Premiership. 

He scored 32 tries and 72 goals. A Sydney and New South Wales representative, Dougherty was also chosen to play for Australia but was injured forcing him out of that match.

References

South Sydney Rabbitohs players
Australian rugby league players
City New South Wales rugby league team players
New South Wales rugby league team players
1931 births
Living people
Rugby league five-eighths
Rugby league players from Newcastle, New South Wales